Nils Döring (born 23 April 1980) is a German footballer.

Born in Wiesbaden, he was playing for SV Wehen Wiesbaden's reserves, while being both team manager and assistant for the sport director for the first team, SV Wehen Wiesbaden. He was named interim manager of the first team on 25 October 2021.

References

External links

1. FC Kaiserslautern II players
1980 births
2. Bundesliga players
3. Liga players
German footballers
Living people
Rot Weiss Ahlen players
SC Paderborn 07 players
Sportfreunde Siegen players
SV Wehen Wiesbaden players
Sportspeople from Wiesbaden
Association football defenders
Footballers from Hesse
German football managers
SV Wehen Wiesbaden managers
TSV Schott Mainz players
3. Liga managers